Marian Pam Baird  is an Australian academic researcher, Professor of Gender and Employment Relations and Head of the Discipline of Work and Organisational Studies at the University of Sydney. She is also Foundation Director, Women and Work Research Group. Her research focuses on all aspects of women in the workforce over their lifespan.

Academic career 
Baird completed her secondary education at Stella Maris College in Manly, New South Wales. She graduated with a BEc (1978) and DipEd (1979), followed by a PhD (2001) in Work and Organisational Studies, all from the University of Sydney. Her 2000 thesis was titled "Transforming industrial relations: Brownfield sites, greenfield sites and commitment systems at Colgate-Palmolive".

Baird has contributed to government policy in the area of paid parental leave.

She is joint editor-in-chief of the Journal of Industrial Relations, former president and current (as of 2020) committee member of the Industrial Relations Society of New South Wales.

Honours and recognition 
In 2014 Baird won the Edna Ryan Award "for making positive change for women in the workforce."

Baird was elected a Fellow of the Academy of the Social Sciences in Australia in 2015. In the 2016 Queen's Birthday Honours she was appointed an Officer of the Order of Australia for "distinguished service to higher education, and to women, particularly in the areas of workplace gender equality, parental leave policy and industrial relations, and to social justice".

In 2018 Apolitical named Baird in the top 100 people in the world working in gender policy.

Selected works

Books

Articles

References

External links 

 Marian Baird interviewed by Jane Caro and Catherine Fox on "Women With Clout"
 

Living people
Year of birth missing (living people)
Officers of the Order of Australia
Fellows of the Academy of the Social Sciences in Australia
University of Sydney alumni
Academic staff of the University of Sydney
Gender studies academics
Australian women academics